Rohan Bopanna and Colin Fleming were the defending champions, but Bopanna chose not to participate.  Fleming played alongside Ross Hutchins, but lost in the quarterfinals to Marin Draganja and Mate Pavić.
Julien Benneteau and Édouard Roger-Vasselin won the title, defeating Paul Hanley and Jonathan Marray in the final, 4–6, 7–6(8–6), [13–11].

Seeds

Draw

Draw

References
 Main Draw

Open 13 - Doubles
2014 Doubles